The 2013–14 Liga de Fútbol Profesional Boliviano season was the 37th season of LFPB.

Teams
The number of teams for 2012 remains the same. Petrolero and La Paz were relegated to the Liga Nacional B. They were replaced by the 2012–13 Liga Nacional B champion Guabirá and Sport Boys.

Torneo Apertura

Standings

Results

Torneo Clausura

Standings

Results

Relegation

Source:

Relegation/promotion playoff

Petrolero has won on penalties shoot-out and Aurora was relegated to the Liga Nacional B.

References

External links
 Official website of the LFPB 
 Official regulations 

2013
2013 in South American football leagues
2014 in South American football leagues
1